Carian is a Unicode block containing the Masson set and four additional characters for writing the ancient Carian language in Caria and Egypt, where the Carians served as mercenaries.

History
The following Unicode-related documents record the purpose and process of defining specific characters in the Carian block:

References 

Unicode blocks